Toufen (Hakka PFS: Thèu-fun; Hokkien POJ: Thâu-hūn) is a county-administered city in northern Miaoli County, Taiwan. Its city centre forms a continuous urban area with Zhunan.

History
In 2007, there was a revitalization project for the community houses in the city which was funded by Council of Cultural Affairs and private sectors which turned the buildings into a museum of chronicling life in the 1950s and 1960s. On 5 October 2015, Toufen was upgraded from an urban township to a county-administered city.

Geography
Surrounding the city are Miaoli County's Zhunan, Zaoqiao and Sanwan townships to the northwest/west, southwest and southeast, respectively, and Hsinchu County to the northeast and east. As of January 2023, its total population was estimated at 105,513, including 52,055 males and 51,107 females.

Administrative divisions
The city comprises 32 villages: Chenggong, Douhuan, Gexing, Guangxing, Heping, Houzhuang, Jianguo, Jianshan, Jianxia, Lankeng, Liutung, Luzhu, Minquan, Minsheng, Minzu, Pantao, Renai, Shangpu, Shangxing, Shanhu, Shanxia, Tianliao, Tongzhuang, Toufen, Tuniu, Wenhua, Xiaxing, Xinglong, Xinhua, Xinyi, Zhongxiao and Zijiang.

Tourist attractions
 Toufen Backyard Garden
 Shang Shun Mall
 Luzhunan Historical House
 Toufen Jianguo Night Market

Transportation
Toufen is accessible by Zhunan Station of the Taiwan Railways Administration located in the neighboring Zhunan Township. The Taiwan High Speed Rail passes through the central part of the city, but no station is currently planned. 

Toufen is also served by Freeway 1, Provincial Highways 1, 1B, 3, 13, 13A, and County Routes 124, 124A, and 124C.

Notable natives
 Hsieh Chin-ting, Magistrate of Miaoli County (1981–1989)
 Hsu Yao-chang, Magistrate of Miaoli County

References

External links